The Cebu City Philippines Temple is the 133rd operating temple of the Church of Jesus Christ of Latter-day Saints (LDS Church). Located in Lahug in Cebu City, it is the second LDS temple in the Philippines.

History
Announced in 2006, the temple was dedicated in three sessions on June 13, 2010, following a two-week open house period.

The plans to build a temple in Cebu City were announced by the LDS Church to local church leaders on 18 April 2006. Ground was broken and the site was dedicated on 14 November 2007 by Dallin H. Oaks, a member of the church's Quorum of the Twelve Apostles.

The temple was built on an  site that it shares with a church meetinghouse, patron house, residences for the temple and mission presidents, and a mission office.

In 2020, the Cebu City Philippines Temple was closed temporarily during the year in response to the coronavirus pandemic.

See also

 The Church of Jesus Christ of Latter-day Saints in the Philippines
 Comparison of temples of The Church of Jesus Christ of Latter-day Saints
 List of temples of The Church of Jesus Christ of Latter-day Saints
 List of temples of The Church of Jesus Christ of Latter-day Saints by geographic region
 Temple architecture (LDS Church)

References

External links
Cebu City Philippines Temple Official site
Cebu City Philippines Temple at ChurchofJesusChristTemples.org

The Church of Jesus Christ of Latter-day Saints in the Philippines
Temples (LDS Church) in the Philippines
Buildings and structures in Cebu City
21st-century Latter Day Saint temples
Religious buildings and structures completed in 2010
2010 establishments in the Philippines